Cameron Stokes is a former Australian rules football player who played with the Hawthorn Football Club in the Australian Football League. Stokes was recruited to the Hawks via the 2008 AFL rookie draft, selected at pick 54. He made his AFL debut in the opening round of the 2008 AFL season, alongside fellow Northern Territorian Cyril Rioli. Stokes played all his junior football with the Darwin Football Club in the Northern Territory Football League (NTFL). Stokes is a former captain of the Northern Territory under age state team.

Stokes relatives are his father's maternal cousin Andrew McLeod and his father's paternal cousins Greg, Gilbert and Adrian McAdam.    His father Steven and great-uncle Don Stokes are both former Nichols Medal winners, the best and fairest award in the NTFL. His grandfather Sam Stokes, great grandfather Ali Ahmat and great-great-grandfather Put AhMat have all played for the Darwin along with many other family members. Cameron's uncle Frank Stokes also played for the Manly Sea Eagles in the New South Wales Rugby League for many years.

After playing 9 games in 2008, including the qualifying final, Stokes missed out on the preliminary and Hawthorn's 2008 AFL Grand Final victory due to a hamstring injury. Stokes played 10 games in 2009 but again had hamstring and shoulder problems and then ruptured his ACL at the end of the year with Box Hill. He was in rehab for most of the 2010 season, and subsequently delisted at the end of 2010.

Statistics

|- style="background-color:#EAEAEA"
| 2008 ||  || 44
| 9 || 6 || 4 || 44 || 47 || 91 || 26 || 30 || 0.7 || 0.4 || 4.9 || 5.2 || 10.1 || 2.9 || 3.3 || 0
|-
| 2009 ||  || 44
| 10 || 2 || 4 || 32 || 58 || 90 || 22 || 17 || 0.2 || 0.4 || 3.2 || 5.8 || 9.0 || 2.2 || 1.7 || 0
|- style="background-color:#EAEAEA"
| 2010 ||  || 44
| 1 || 0 || 0 || 0 || 3 || 3 || 0 || 6 || 0.0 || 0.0 || 0.0 || 3.0 || 3.0 || 0.0 || 6.0 || 0
|- class="sortbottom"
! colspan=3| Career
! 20 !! 8 !! 8 !! 76 !! 108 !! 184 !! 48 !! 53 !! 0.4 !! 0.4 !! 3.8 !! 5.4 !! 9.2 !! 2.4 !! 2.7 !! 0
|}

References

External links
 

Australian rules footballers from the Northern Territory
Hawthorn Football Club players
Indigenous Australian players of Australian rules football
Darwin Football Club players
Living people
1989 births
Sturt Football Club players
Box Hill Football Club players
North Adelaide Football Club players
Northern Territory Football Club players